Hector McRae (March 21, 1837 – August 12, 1920) was a member of the Wisconsin State Assembly.

Biography
McRae was born on March 21, 1837 in Stormont County, Upper Canada. He moved to Chippewa Falls, Wisconsin in 1868. He died of stomach cancer in Chippewa Falls on August 12, 1920.

Career
McRae was elected to the Assembly in 1879. Previously, he served four terms as Treasurer of Chippewa County, Wisconsin. He was a Republican.

References

Canadian emigrants to the United States
Politicians from Chippewa Falls, Wisconsin
Republican Party members of the Wisconsin State Assembly
1837 births
1920 deaths